Radina Miroslavova Borshosh (born December 31, 1997) is a Bulgarian stage and film actress.

She is best known in portraying Anya in Bulgarian short film Solveig (2015), Iva in the Bulgarian drama film Monkey (2016), Desi in Bulgarian sitcom Us, ours and yours (2017), Fausta in British documentary series Eight Years That Made Rome (2017), Sonya in Attraction (2018), Raya Bozhinova in Strawberry Moon (2020) and Heaven in Dante's Heaven (2021).

She is also known for voicing the Bulgarian dub of Aurora in Disney's Maleficent: Mistress of Evil (2019).

Biography 
Radina Borshosh was born on December 31, 1997, Sofia, Bulgaria. She is the daughter of the Bulgarian politician Miroslav Borshosh and TV journalist Iskra Vladimirova. In 2020, she graduated from the National Academy for Theatre and Film Arts in Stefan Danailov's last class with a degree in drama theatre.

Borshosh is part in troupe of Ivan Vazov National Theatre. Her stage performances include The Little Foxes by Lillian Hellman, Three Tall Women by Edward Albee, When Thunder Strikes, The Echo Fades by Peyo Yavorov, Duel, Oh, You Whoever You Are...  and A New Land by Ivan Vazov, and The Tempest by William Shakespeare, directed by Robert Wilson.

She made her film debut in 2013 in Bulgarian TV series Nedadenite, produced by her father Miroslav Borshosh, in a little role as a Liza's classmate in 8th episode, later she appeared in other movies and TV series, including Solveig, Monkey, Us, ours and yours, Attraction, Strawberry Moon and Dante's Heaven.

She is the voice of Princess Aurora in the Bulgarian dub of Disney's Maleficent: Mistress of Evil.

Filmography

Personal life 
She is an relationship with the photographer Vladimir Tomashevich.

References

External links
 
 

1997 births
Living people
Actresses from Sofia
21st-century Bulgarian actresses
Bulgarian film actresses
Bulgarian stage actresses
Bulgarian television actresses
Bulgarian voice actresses